William Berrian Vail,  (December 19, 1823 – April 10, 1904) was a Canadian businessman and politician.

Biography 
Vail was born in Sussex Vale, New Brunswick, the son of John Cougle Vail and Charlotte Hannah Arnold. In 1850, he married Charlotte Leslie Jones. He represented Digby County in the Nova Scotia House of Assembly from 1867 to 1874. He served in the province's Executive Council as provincial secretary. In 1874, he was elected to the 3rd Canadian Parliament as the Liberal Member of Parliament for Digby. From 1874 to 1878, he was the Minister of Militia and Defence under Alexander Mackenzie. He resigned because of a conflict of interest in the 1877 but returned to parliament in 1882 where he served as an opposition MP until he lost his seat once again in the 1887 general election. He died in Dover, England.

His brother Edwin Arnold Vail served in the New Brunswick assembly.

References
 
 

1823 births
1904 deaths
Nova Scotia Liberal Party MLAs
Liberal Party of Canada MPs
Members of the House of Commons of Canada from Nova Scotia
Members of the King's Privy Council for Canada
Provincial Secretaries of New Brunswick

Canadian Militia officers